Ahmed I or Ahmad I may refer to:

 Ahmed I Bakhti (1590–1617), Turkish sultan
 Ahmad I (Kalat), Wāli of Kalat, ruled 1666–1667
 Ahmad al-Mansur (1549–1603), sultan of Morocco, ruled 1578–1603
 Ahmad I ibn Mustafa (1806–1855), Bey of Tunis
 Ahmad Al-Jaber Al-Sabah (1885–1950), sheikh of Kuwait
 Ahmad ibn 'Ali Al Thani (1917–1977), emir of Qatar

See also
 Ahmad
 Amad (disambiguation)
 Ahmad (disambiguation)